The women's long jump event  at the 1990 European Athletics Indoor Championships was held in Kelvin Hall on 4 March.

Results

References

Long jump at the European Athletics Indoor Championships
Long
1990 in women's athletics